Shuangyashan West railway station is a railway station in Jixian County, Shuangyashan, Heilongjiang, China. It opened on 6 December 2021 with the Mudanjiang–Jiamusi high-speed railway. It is the easternmost high-speed railway station in China.

References

Railway stations in Heilongjiang
Railway stations in China opened in 2021